Rashtram is a 2006 Indian Malayalam-language film,  directed by Anil C Menon and produced by C Karunakaran. The film stars Suresh Gopi, Laya, Madhu.

Plot
Malaikkal Ouseppachan is a politician. The chief minister of Kerala Janardhanan Kurup is his friend along with Saghav Gopalan. One day Janardhanan Kurup dies in hospital after having a heart attack at a meeting. He tells Ouseppachan that he wants him to be minister. Janardhanan Kurup dies after saying this. Ouseppachan ponders this and calls other people of the Party. In the end he says he is unfit for the job and makes his son Malaikkal Thommi (Suresh Gopi) chief minister. Thommi sorts out many problems. But some people hate him. They launch an attack on Thommi's house. Next Ouseppachan is killed by a lorry. Thommi gets revenge by killing them on Independence Day.

Cast

Suresh Gopi as Maliyekkal Thomas Joseph / 'Thommi'
Laya as Celine
Madhu as Maliyekkal Joseph / 'Ouseppachan'
Nedumudi Venu as Chief Minister Janardhanan Kurup
Thilakan as Sakhavu Gopalan Marar
Sai Kumar as Nooruddin
Vijayaraghavan as Philipose
Adithya Menon as Ameer Musthafa
Bheeman Raghu as Koshy
Suresh Krishna as Mukundan
Janardanan as Keshavan Menon
Sona Nair as Alice
K. P. A. C. Lalitha
Pallavi Narayanan as Maliyekkal Thommi's niece
Meghanathan as Peter
P. Sreekumar as Jacob
Chali Pala as Vincent
Baiju Ezhupunna as Stephen
Babu Swamy as Divakara Pillai
Kollam Ajith as Kunjappan
T. P. Madhavan as Govindan
Prem Prakash as Charles
Subair as C.I. Basheer
Sadiq as Abdullah
V. K. Sreeraman as Ibrahim
Ponnamma Babu

Soundtrack
The music was composed by Deepak Dev.

References

External links
 
 

2006 films
2000s Malayalam-language films